High level bombing (also called high-altitude bombing) is a tactic of dropping bombs from bomber aircraft in level flight at high altitude. The term is used in contrast to both World War II-era dive bombing and medium or low level bombing.

Prior to the modern age of precision-guided munitions (PGMs), high level bombing was primarily used for strategic bombing—inflicting mass damage on the enemy's economy and population—not for attacks on specific military targets. High level bombing missions have been flown by many different types of aircraft, including medium bombers, heavy bombers, strategic bombers and fighter-bombers.

The choice to use high level bombing as an offensive tactic of aerial warfare is dependent not only upon the inherent accuracy and effectiveness of the bombing aircraft and their delivered ordnance on the target, but also upon a target's air defense capabilities. From the 1940s onward, radar in particular became a powerful new defensive early warning tool, and a serious threat to attacking aircraft when they flew at higher altitudes towards their target.

Bombing from medium to high altitudes, especially in the post-World War II era with sophisticated surface-to-air missiles, interceptor aircraft and radars exposes attacking bomber aircraft to greater risks of detection, interception and destruction. During World War II, various methods were employed to protect high level bombers from flak, fighter aircraft and radar detection, including defensive armament, escort fighters, chaff and electronic jamming. Modern stealth aircraft technologies, for example, can alleviate some risks inherent to high level bombing missions, but are not a guarantee of success or permanent solution for the attackers.

World War II 

High level bombers were primarily used by the Allies for carpet bombing (particularly later in the war), such as the bombing of Dresden or Tokyo. They were also deployed in other kinds of missions such as Operation Tidal Wave, Operation Crossbow, and the sinking of the Tirpitz.

After initial operations by day suffered heavy losses, the British switched to night-time sorties where the darkness gave some protection against German fighters. Arthur "Bomber" Harris's strategy for the RAF Bomber Command was to attack area targets that the bombers could be more certain of hitting at night, while the U.S. preferred daylight, precision bombing techniques.  The development since the 1930s of gyroscope-stabilised optical bombsights, such as the Norden bombsight, also helped the Allied air forces' ability to accurately strike their targets with medium- to high-altitude level bombing attacks.

Nazi Germany used high level bombers such as the Heinkel He 111, the Dornier Do 17 and multi-role aircraft such as the Junkers Ju 88 against the Allies in the Battle of Britain, both for carpet bombing and for precision attacks on British radar stations as part of Operation Eagle.

Cold War 

During the Cold War, the United States and Soviet Union used several bomber designs, but the bulk of their offensive forces were in the form of, respectively, the B-52 Stratofortress and Tu-95 Bear. The French equivalent was the Mirage IV, and the UK had its V bombers.

The U.S. Strategic Air Command (SAC) ordered massive high level bombing in Operation Rolling Thunder and Operation Menu during the Vietnam War.

See also 
 Attack aircraft
 Fighter-bomber
 Heavy bomber
 Light bomber
 Medium bomber
 Schnellbomber
 Strategic bombing

References 

Aerial bombing